"X You" is a progressive house song produced by Swedish house producer and DJ Avicii. The track was released as a digital download in Sweden on 26 February 2013. It is the final production for Avicii's successful project "Avicii X You". The song features sequences from Kian Sang (melody), Naxsy (bassline), Martin Kupilas (beat and rhythm), Ваня Хакси (break), Jonathan Madray, Mateusz Kolata, TheW and Christian Westphalen (effects). The song is written in the key of G minor, at a tempo of 126 BPM.

Music video
The video for "X You" was released on Avicii's VEVO YouTube channel on 26 February 2013. The music video contains various clips of Avicii at work on the song and other short clips of nature for 5–10 seconds. It also contains text explaining the project, how many people contributed, the winners and the contributing countries. The video concludes with a time of 3 minutes and 46 seconds.

As of March 2023, the video has received over 16 million views.

Track listing

Charts

Weekly charts

Year-end charts

Release history

References

2013 singles
2013 songs
Avicii songs
Songs written by Avicii
Song recordings produced by Avicii